Smith Hospital is a former medical facility in Paris, Arkansas, located at the northern end of Express Street. Built in 1913 and enlarged in 1926, it was the first hospital in Logan County. It consists of an original two-story brick building, to which a three-story annex was added in 1926.  Its interior finishes reflect alterations made in 1926.  It served as the local hospital until 1971.

The building was listed on the National Register of Historic Places in 1994.

See also
National Register of Historic Places listings in Logan County, Arkansas

References

Commercial buildings on the National Register of Historic Places in Arkansas
Colonial Revival architecture in Arkansas
Hospital buildings completed in 1913
Buildings and structures in Paris, Arkansas